Sužid is a village near Kobarid in the Littoral region of Slovenia.

Church

The church in the village is dedicated to the Three Kings. It dates from the end of the 15th century and contains a statue of Saint Martin from the 16th century. The fresco on the rear wall of the church dates from the 17th century. The chancel was richly painted in the 17th century.

References

External links

Sužid on Geopedia

Populated places in the Municipality of Kobarid